Austrått is a borough of the city of Sandnes in the west part of the large municipality of Sandnes in Rogaland county, Norway.  The  borough lies just southeast of the main city centre of Sandnes.  The borough has a population (2016) of 8,251.  Prior to 2011, the borough of Bogafjell was a part of Austrått, but it was split off to form its own borough at that time.  Høyland Church is located in Austrått.

References

Boroughs and neighbourhoods of Sandnes